Kearny may refer to:

People
Cresson Kearny (1914–2003, American author and researcher
Kearny fallout meter
Kearny air pump
Eleanor Kearny Carr (1840–1912), American planter and political hostess, First Lady of North Carolina
Jillian Kearny,  a pseudonym of Ron Goulart
Lawrence Kearny (1789–1868), American naval officer and diplomat
Philip Kearny (1815–1862), American major general
Stephen W. Kearny (1794–1848), American brigadier general, Military Governor of New Mexico and California

Places
Kearny, Arizona
Kearny, New Jersey
Kearny County, Kansas
Fort Kearny, in Nebraska
Fort Kearny (Washington, D.C.), an American Civil War fort
Fort Phil Kearny, a late 1860s fort along the Bozeman Trail in Wyoming
Kearny Street, in San Francisco, California

Other
Kearny Airport (disambiguation)
Kearny High School (disambiguation)
USS Kearny (DD-432), US Navy destroyer named for Lawrence Kearny

See also

Kearney (disambiguation)